Adams Township is one of the twenty-two townships of Washington County, Ohio, United States.  The 2000 census found 1,830 people in the township, 1,202 of whom lived in the unincorporated portions of the township.

Geography
Located in the northern part of the county, it borders the following townships:
Jackson Township, Noble County - north
Aurelius Township - northeast corner
Salem Township - east
Muskingum Township - southeast
Watertown Township - southwest
Waterford Township - west

The village of Lowell is located in southeastern Adams Township.

Name and history
It is one of ten Adams Townships statewide.

Government

The township is governed by a three-member board of trustees, who are elected in November of odd-numbered years to a four-year term beginning on the following January 1. Two are elected in the year after the presidential election and one is elected in the year before it. There is also an elected township fiscal officer, who serves a four-year term beginning on April 1 of the year after the election, which is held in November of the year before the presidential election. Vacancies in the fiscal officership or on the board of trustees are filled by the remaining trustees.

References

External links
County website

Townships in Washington County, Ohio
Townships in Ohio